The 2023 Intercontinental GT Challenge is the eighth season of the Intercontinental GT Challenge. It comprises five rounds starting with the Bathurst 12 Hour on 3 February with the finale at Gulf 12 Hours on 9 December.

Calendar

Entries

Championship standings
Scoring system
Championship points were awarded for the first ten positions in each race. Entries were required to complete 75% of the winning car's race distance in order to be classified and earn points. Individual drivers were required to participate for a minimum of 25 minutes in order to earn championship points in any race. A manufacturer only received points for its two highest placed cars in each round.

Drivers' championships
The results indicate the classification relative to other drivers in the series, not the classification in the race.

See also 
 2023 British GT Championship
 2023 GT World Challenge Europe
 2023 GT World Challenge Europe Sprint Cup
 2023 GT World Challenge Europe Endurance Cup
 2023 GT World Challenge Asia
 2023 GT World Challenge America
 2023 GT World Challenge Australia

References

External links 

Intercontinental GT
Intercontinental GT